Swing High is a 1930 American pre-Code musical film directed by Joseph Santley and starring Helen Twelvetrees, Fred Scott and Dorothy Burgess.

The film's sets were designed by the art director Carroll Clark.

Cast
 Helen Twelvetrees as Maryan Garner 
 Fred Scott as Garry 
 Dorothy Burgess as Trixie 
 John Sheehan as Doc May 
 Daphne Pollard as Mrs. May 
 George Fawcett as Pop Garner 
 Bryant Washburn as Ringmaster Joe 
 Nick Stuart as Billy 
 Sally Starr as Ruth 
 'Little Billy' Rhodes as Major Tiny 
 William Hall as Babe 
 Stepin Fetchit as Sam 
 Chester Conklin asa Sheriff 
 Ben Turpin as Bartender 
 Robert Edeson as Doctor 
 Mickey Bennett as Mickey 
 Dannie Mac Grant as Young Boy 
 Clarence Muse as Singer 
 Rolfe Sedan as Trouper

References

Bibliography
 Bradley, Edwin M. The First Hollywood Musicals: A Critical Filmography Of 171 Features, 1927 Through 1932. McFarland, 2004.

External links
 

1930 films
1930 musical films
American musical films
Films directed by Joseph Santley
Pathé Exchange films
American black-and-white films
1930s English-language films
1930s American films